Avraham Barkai (1921 in Berlin – 29 February 2020 in Kibbutz Lehavot HaBashan) was a German-born Israeli historian and researcher of antisemitism. He died at age 99 on 29 February 2020 in Lehavot HaBashan.

Publications
Barkai, Avraham. From Boycott to Annihilation: The Economic Struggle of German Jews, 1933-1943. The Tauber Institute for the Study of European Jewry series, 11. Hanover NH: Published for Brandeis University Press by University Press of New England, 1989.  (held in over 400 US libraries according to WorldCat)  translation of his Vom Boykott zur "Entjudung".
Barkai, Avraham. Nazi Economics: Ideology, Theory, and Policy. New Haven: Yale University Press, 1990.  (held in over 500 US libraries according to WorldCat)  (translation of his Wirtschaftssystem des Nationalsozialismus.)
Barkai, Avraham. Branching Out: German-Jewish Immigration to the United States, 1820-1914. Ellis Island series. New York: Holmes & Meier, 1994.  (held in over 350 US libraries according to WorldCat) 
Barkai, Avraham, and Schoschanna Barkai-Lasker. Jüdische Minderheit und Industrialisierung: Demographie, Berufe, und Einkommem der Juden in Westdeutschland 1850-1914. Schriftenreihe wissenschaftlicher Abhandlungen des Leo Baeck Instituts, Bd. 46. Tübingen: J.S.B. Mohr (P. Siebeck), 1988. 
Barkai, Avraham. "Wehr dich!": der Centralverein deutscher Staatsbürger jüdischen Glaubens (C.V.) 1893-1938. München: Beck, 2002.
Barkai, Avraham. Hoffnung und Untergang: Studien zur deutsch-jüdischen Geschichte des 19. und 20. Jahrhunderts. Hamburger Beiträge zur Sozial- und Zeitgeschichte, Bd. 36. Hamburg: Christians, 1998. 
Barkai, Avraham. "Das Wirtschaftssystem des Nationalsozialismus: der historische und ideologische Hintergrund, 1933-1936". Koln: Verlag Wissenschaft und Politik, c1977. 
Barkai, Avraham. Vom Boykott zur "Entjudung": der wirtschaftliche Existenzkampf der Juden im Dritten Reich, 1933-1943. Frankfurt am Main : Fischer, 1988. 
Barkai, Avraham. Jüdische Minderheit und Industrialisierung : Demographie, Berufe, und Einkommem der Juden in Westdeutschland 1850-1914. Tübingen : J.S.B. Mohr (P. Siebeck), 1988. 
Barkai, Avraham. Oscar Wassermann und die Deutsche Bank : Bankier in schwierigen Zeiten. München: Beck, c2005.  (cl.)

References
 

Israeli historians
Jewish historians
German emigrants to Israel
Writers from Berlin
1921 births
2020 deaths